General elections were held in Malta on 12 December 1981.

For the 1981 elections, the opposition Nationalist Party, reinvigorated with a new leader, looked set for a serious challenge to Mintoff. In fact, in that election, the Partit Nazzjonalista managed an absolute majority of votes, but it managed only 31 seats to the Labour Party's 34. Dom Mintoff said that he would not be ready to govern in such conditions and hinted that he would call for fresh elections within six months. However, this was not to be: Mintoff eventually accepted the President's invitation to form a government.
This led to a political crisis whose effects continued through much of the 1980s, as well as increasing political violence in the street.

The election resulted in controversy because although the Nationalist Party received a majority of votes, the voting system in use led to Malta Labour Party winning a majority of seats and governing the Maltese islands with a disputed mandate, until the 1987 elections. This provoked a constitutional crisis, with the Nationalist Party boycotting parliament.

As a result a compromise was reached whereby changes were made to the voting system to prevent a recurrence of the same problem. Under the new system if a repeat of the 1981 scenario occurs, the party supported by an overall majority of voters is awarded a number of additional seats from a party list, so that it secures a parliamentary majority.

Electoral system
The 1981 election was held under the single transferable vote (PR-STV) system, with five-seat constituencies. Under the agreement reached following the 1981 election additional 'bonus' seats were introduced.

Results

References

General elections in Malta
General
Malta
Malta